Electoral district of Hamilton may refer to:

 Hamilton (UK Parliament constituency), a former electorate of the UK House of Commons
Electoral district of Hamilton (New South Wales), a former electorate of the New South Wales Legislative Assembly
 Electoral district of Hamilton (Queensland), a former electorate of the Queensland Legislative Assembly